Jacobsbaai is a settlement in West Coast District Municipality in the Western Cape province of South Africa.

Jacobsbaai was founded as a small town on the farmland registered as 109 Jacobsbaai. The name is said to have come from the Frenchman Jacques Titius. He was a colonial trader in the West Coast. Tietiesbaai is also named after him, and Jacobsbaai has a street called Titius. Another explanation for the name is that the English king entrusted the piece of land to a local known as ‘Jacob'.

References

Populated places in the Saldanha Bay Local Municipality